Jeffrey Scott Gillan (born June 1, 1957) is an American journalist and TV news anchor.

Education
Gillan attended college in Washington, D.C., receiving his undergraduate degree from Georgetown University and his master's degree in journalism and public affairs from American University.

Career
Gillan worked for eight years as an anchor and the managing editor at the cable channel Las Vegas One and KLAS-TV before joining KVBC-TV in November 2009 as its assistant news director. He left a TV anchor job at WKOW in Madison, Wisconsin, after 11 years to take the Las Vegas One position.

Awards and nominations
 2006, won Pacific Southwest Regional Emmy Award for KLAS-TV
 2009, won Pacific Southwest Regional Emmy Award for KLAS-TV
 2016, won Pacific Southwest Regional Emmy Award for KSNV

References

External links
 

1957 births
Living people
American male journalists
American television reporters and correspondents
American University School of Communication alumni
Georgetown University alumni
Journalists from Arkansas
Journalists from Las Vegas
Journalists from Wisconsin
Journalists from Virginia
Television anchors from Las Vegas